Johannes Müller (born 29 November 1960 in Wolfhagen) is a German prehistoric archaeologist. Currently, he is Professor at Kiel University (since 2004). He has achieved a high international reputation in the field, as he has repeatedly initiated or played a major role in developing great research projects, such as the Priority Programme SPP 1400, the Excellence Initiative "Graduate School: Human Development in Landscapes", the Collaborative Research Centre CRC 1266 and the Cluster of Excellence ROOTS. Judging by the interdisciplinary character of these projects, the number of universities and research institutes from different countries involved and, above all, the budget provided by the German Research Foundation, these projects can be described as extraordinary in this research field.

Müller has supervised dozens of theses (diploma, master's, bachelor's, master's, doctorate, post-doctoral) and thus influenced an entire generation of archaeologists. He has published a number of scientific articles, is (co-)editor of numerous journals and volumes and has written several popular science articles or his own books. For his achievements in  international collaborations, he was awarded the Medal of Honour of the Adam Miekiewic University of Poznań in 2019 and the Swedish Riksbankens Jubileumsfond in 2021.

References

External links

1960 births
Living people
German archaeologists
People from Wolfhagen
Academic staff of the University of Kiel